Kirovskaya is a station on the Avtozavodskaya line of the Nizhny Novgorod Metro. It opened on 15 November 1989 along with Park Kultury as part of the Metro's third phase. It is in the Avtozavodsky district of Nizhny Novgorod at the intersection of Prospekt Lenina and Prospekt Kirova, the street for which the station is named.

References

Nizhny Novgorod Metro stations
Railway stations in Russia opened in 1989
Railway stations located underground in Russia